Old Furnace may refer to:

United Kingdom
The Old Furnace, Staffordshire, England

United States
 Old Furnace, Delaware, Sussex County
 Old Furnace, Massachusetts, a village in the town of Hardwick, Worcester County
 Old Furnace, Pennsylvania, Union County
 Old Furnace State Park, a public recreation area in Killingly, Connecticut
 Old Furnace Wildlife Area, a state wildlife area in Sussex County, Delaware

Other places
 Old Furnace, Ironbridge, a village in Shropshire, England